Trictenotoma lansbergei is a species of beetle in the Trictenotomidae family.

Distribution
This species can be found in Indonesia (Nias Island).

References

Tenebrionoidea
Beetles described in 1882